Scott Ross may refer to:

 Scott Ross (film executive) (born 1951), Founder, Chairman, and CEO of Digital Domain (1993–2006); pioneer in digital entertainment
 Scott Ross, interviewer for The 700 Club with ties to various 1960s and 1970s rock musicians
 Scott Ross (American football) (1968–2014), American football player
 Scott Ross (Oz), character on the HBO series Oz
 Scott Ross (private investigator)
 Scott Ross (harpsichordist) (1951–1989)